The Greenfield College is a private university in Ghana. The college was established in 2016  and it was accredited by the National Accreditation Board in January 2017. It is also affiliated to the Kwame Nkrumah University of Science and Technology.

Faculty of Law
The National Accreditation Board (NAB) granted accreditation to the college to set up the Faculty of Law to run Bachelor of Laws (LL.B) degree Programmes in 2017. Subsequently, the first batch of students totalling thirty-five students (35) were admitted in the 2017/2018 Academic Year.

Professional Programmes
The Faculty of Law offers the following programmes:
1. Four (4) year LL.B for Non-Degree  Holders (Full Time)(Day) for which the entry requirement is grade C6 or better in three (3) core subjects and three (3) elective subjects. A pass in selection test and an interview.
2. Three (3) year Post Degree LL. B (Full Time) (Weekend) for which the entry requirement is a good first degree from a recognized University and a pass in a selection test and an interview

References

External links
Official Website
Greenfield College on National Accreditation Board website

Universities in Ghana
Educational institutions established in 2016
2016 establishments in Ghana